Di Yee is one of the 41 constituencies in the Sha Tin District.

Created for the 2019 District Council elections, the constituency returns one district councillor to the Sha Tin District Council, with an election every four years.

Di Yee loosely covers residential flats in Castello, Greenhill Villa and Shek Mun Estate Phase 2 in Shek Mun. It has projected population of 16,877.

Councillors represented

Election results

2010s

References

Sha Tin District
Constituencies of Hong Kong
Constituencies of Sha Tin District Council
2019 establishments in Hong Kong
Constituencies established in 2019